Luciano Ursino (born October 31, 1988 in Buenos Aires, Argentina) is an Argentine footballer currently playing for Bolovian club The Strongest.

Teams
  Temperley 2008-2010
  3 de Febrero 2010
  Zamora F.C. 2011–2012
  Independiente FBC 2012–2013
  Estudiantes Mérida 2013–2014
  Atlético Venezuela 2014
  Deportivo La Guaira 2014– 
  Real Club Deportivo España 2015−

References
 Profile at BDFA 
 

1988 births
Living people
Argentine footballers
Argentine expatriate footballers
Zamora FC players
Real C.D. España players
Liga Nacional de Fútbol Profesional de Honduras players
Expatriate footballers in Bolivia
Expatriate footballers in Honduras
Expatriate footballers in Paraguay
Expatriate footballers in Venezuela
Association footballers not categorized by position
Footballers from Buenos Aires